Jalukie 'B' is a village in the Peren district of Nagaland, India. It is located in the Jalukie Circle.

Demographics 

According to the 2011 census of India, Jalukie 'B' has 431 households. The effective literacy rate (i.e. the literacy rate of population excluding children aged 6 and below) is 81.36%.

Jalukie 'B' is bordered by Samziuram in the east, New Jalukie and Deukwaram in the west, Old Jalukie in the south and Jalukie town in the north. it is a village of diversity where we find people practicing different faith such as Christianity (Baptist and Catholic), Heraka cult, and many others.

Jalukie 'B' was founded in the year 1973 by the elders of old Jalukie. it was formed as an extension of Old Jalukie village later recognized as a village with its own administration. Today the village functions under the Village Council with other subordinate organizations such as Women Council, Youth Organization etc. Gaonburas which formed a part of the earlier British administration still functions today as an associating body with the Village Council mainly playing the advisory role in decision making relating to customary laws .
The Village Council consist of 8 elected members, two each from the four blocks (A,B,C & D). The elected members then elects a chairman who heads the council. The Village Council has different subordinate departments such as VDB committee, Village Education Committee, Village Health Committee, Village Cemetery Committee, Disaster Management Committee, Village Electricity Management Board, etc.

Government High School Jalukie 'B' which has been recently upgraded to a higher secondary status is the lone higher secondary school. Baptist High School Jalukie 'B' is another high school in Jalukie 'B'. There is also a middle school and a primary school, namely Heraka Vidhya Bharati school and Government Primary School Jalukie 'B'.

Jalukie 'B' is a christian dominated village with Baptist denomination as highest. There is a Local Baptist Church, the parent body of most churches and fellowship in Jalukie B. A Liangmai Baptist Phumling, Nepali Fellowship, Christ King Church, Nehemiah Fellowship. There is also a minor heraka cult following.

People from remote villages have come to settled in Jalukie 'B' since its formation and till today we see large number of migration from remote areas and surrounding villages in search of better livelihood, education, work, business etc. It is only befitting to say that Jalukie'B' has also become one of the fastest growing village in Peren district of Nagaland.

References 

Villages in Jalukie Circle